INAS, InAs of Inas may refer to:

 Inas X, an American musician from New York City, New York, United States
 Indian Naval Air Squadron, a flying unit of the Indian Naval Air Arm
 Indian Naval Armament Service, part of the Indian Engineering Services exam conducted by UPSC.
 Indium arsenide, a semiconductor
 Institute of Native American Studies, at the University of Georgia, Athens, Georgia, United States
 International Near-Earth Asteroid Survey
 International Sports Federation for Persons with Intellectual Disability